A Collection is a 2005 DVD by New Order, featuring the majority of their music videos, as well as three alternate versions, two new videos for older songs, and a live performance. It is New Order's first DVD compilation, their previous video collections, (The Best Of) New Order and Substance only having been released on VHS or laserdisc. All regional variations of the DVD are nominally NTSC.

All videos on the DVD are shown in completion, including copyright statements, timing codes and the name/phone number of the companies who did telecine conversions or production of the videos. These elements are rarely, if ever shown on TV or included on DVD releases by other bands.

The DVD was released by Rhino Entertainment, New Order's North American distributors, for Warner Music Vision, although all content is copyrighted to London Records, the band's label.

It was also available as part of Item, a limited edition boxed set that collected A Collection and the re-released New Order Story DVD.

Track listing
Source: Discogs

References

New Order (band) video albums
2005 video albums
Music video compilation albums
2005 compilation albums
New Order (band) compilation albums
Rhino Records compilation albums
Rhino Records video albums
London Records video albums
London Records compilation albums